Sun Arena is an indoor sporting arena located in the city of Ise, Mie Prefecture, Japan.  The capacity of the arena is 11,000. The arena was host to the 2009 World Rhythmic Gymnastics Championships.

External links 
 Official website

Basketball venues in Japan
Indoor arenas in Japan
Kyoto Hannaryz
Sports venues in Mie Prefecture
1994 establishments in Japan
Sports venues completed in 1994
Ise, Mie